Zambia requires its residents to register their motor vehicles and display vehicle registration plates. Current plates are European standard 520 mm × 110 mm, and use FE-Schrift.

References

External links

Zambia
Transport in Zambia
Zambia transport-related lists